The Shire of Barcaldine was a local government area located in central Queensland and headquartered in the town of Barcaldine.

Major industries in the area are wool and grazing.

History 

Kargoolnah Division was created on 11 November 1879 as one of 74 divisions around Queensland under the Divisional Boards Act 1879, and included the areas of Blackall, Tambo and Barcaldine as well as parts of Jericho. On 3 September 1892, a new Barcaldine Division was proclaimed and excised from Kargoolnah.

With the passage of the Local Authorities Act 1902, Barcaldine Division became Shire of Barcaldine on 31 March 1903. On 15 March 2008, under the Local Government (Reform Implementation) Act 2007 passed by the Parliament of Queensland on 10 August 2007, the Shire of Barcaldine merged with the Shires of Aramac and Jericho to form the Barcaldine Region.

The Barcaldine Shire Hall built it in 1912 is now listed on the Queensland Heritage Register.

Towns and localities 
The Shire of Barcaldine included the following settlements:

 Barcaldine
 Barcaldine Downs
 Grant
 Narbethong
 Patrick

Chairmen
 1893: James Cronin
 1894: Henry Sealy 
 1895-1898: Hans C. Puet 
 1899:William Campbell 
 1900: James Meacham
 1901: T.J. Hannay  
 1903: Henry Sealy
 1904: Hans C. Puet 
 1905 William Campbell
 1906: James Meacham 
 1906: Allan Martin Ferguson
 1908: James Cronin 
 1909: Allan Martin Ferguson
 1910: Hans C. Puet 
 1911: Allan Martin Ferguson
 1912: James Cronin 
 1918: T.J. Hannay 
 1919-1920: W.J.Forthergill
 1920-1924: R.A.Parnell
 1924-1930: R.F.Lyons
 1930-1953: C.F. Llyod-Jones  
 1953- 1985 J.D.Bennett OBE 
 1985- 1992 L.T.Norman

Population

References

External links
 

Former local government areas of Queensland
1892 establishments in Australia
2008 disestablishments in Australia
Populated places disestablished in 2008